Amy Karle (born 1980) is an American artist, bioartist and futurist. She creates work that looks forward to a future where technology can support and enhance the human condition. She was named in BBC's 100 women, as one of the 100 inspiring and influential women from around the world for 2019. Her work questions what it means to be human, with an emphasis on exploring the relationship between technology and humanity; particularly how technology and biotechnology impacts health, humanity, evolution and the future. She combines science and technology with art and is known for using live tissue in her works. Karle uses body based investigation and the actual science and technology as tools in the process of creating the artworks. Amy Karle's artworks include new media art, bioart, computational art, hybrid art, body art, durational performance art, installation art, and garments and wearable art. Karle is most noted for her artworks merging the body and technology, including Regenerative Reliquary, Internal Collection, Biofeedback artwork. She regularly exhibits her artworks in major museums around the world including in Ars Electronica, The Centre Pompidou, The Mori Art Museum, The Smithsonian Institution.

Karle is also a futurist, bioethicist, activist and provocateur as her artworks and process encourage the contemplation of the impacts of technology on our future, both positive and negative. Karle speaks and takes part in think tanks regularly. Karle is an exponent of art science collaboration with scientific organizations and technology companies and takes part in residency programs and cross-disciplinary collaborations.

Karle served as an Artist Diplomat on a cultural exchange through the United States Department of State Bureau of Educational and Cultural Affairs where she led workshops focusing on women's empowerment in STEAM fields; and created artwork through collaborations and with culturally significant sites and resources.

Education 
Karle is an alumnus of the School of Art and Design at Alfred University and Cornell University where she received degrees in Art and Design and Philosophy.

Personal life 
Karle was born in New York in 1980 and grew up in Endicott, NY. Her mother was a biochemist and her father was a pharmacist and Karle has said she "grew up in the lab in the pharmacy". Her studio is in San Francisco.

Karle was born with a rare condition, Aplasia cutis congenita, missing a large region of skin on her scalp and also missing bone in her skull. The skin was repaired by an early Tissue expansion surgery at the [Mayo Clinic] that was considered dangerous and experimental at the time that it was performed. This experience deeply impacted her work and desire to heal and enhance the human body and human condition. This early experience also inspired her interest in the links between biology, medical futuring and art.  Karle underwent a series of experimental surgical procedures as a child.

Major works 

Regenerative Reliquary (2016) takes the form of a human hand skeleton design that is 3D-printed in a trabecular structured lattice that is detailed to the microscopic level, out of a custom made biodegradable hydrogel which will disintegrate over time. It is installed in a bioreactor and it is intended that human stem cells seeded on to it could eventually grow into tissue and become bone. The work has been designed with future implantation in mind. Karle had to collaborate with many experts, institutions and companies to create the work. New processes, materials, and 3D printing technologies had to be made to create the work. The BioArtwork is significant as it is the first piece of artwork that combines the computational, biological and physical. Using cells and 3D printed scaffolds is a new medium for art and design. It is scientifically and technologically significant as the largest 3D printed scaffold known to be made. The artist has also created subsequent archival versions which are shown in museums when they are not able to support the full biological exhibition.

Regenerative Reliquary won the Grand Prize at the YouFab Global Creative Awards. It has been widely exhibited internationally, including at Ars Electronica Festival 2017: Artificial Intelligence: AI / The Other I in Linz, Austria. and Post Life Beijing Media Art Biennale 2018  and was included as part of Future Humanity – Our Shared Planet (2018–19) a joint exhibition project by the Central Academy of Fine Arts Beijing, Ars Electronica and Hyundai. Karle delivered a related keynote speech in 2018 at the 2nd Beijing Media Art Biennale (BMAB) Forum on the way people and technology blend together and addressed the question of 'post life'. Regenerative Reliquary was also exhibited at the Centre Pompidou Paris, France, as part of La Fabrique du Vivant (The Fabric of the Living) in 2019 and then at The Lowry, Salford, England, as part of The State of Us (2019–20). It is being shown during 2021 by the Jugendstilsenteret KUBE Art Museum, Ålesund, Norway, as part of the Am I Human to You? exhibition.

Morphologies of Resurrection (2020) is a series of 6 sculptures based on segments of the spine from the Hatcher Triceratops 3D scan data created as part of the Smithsonian residency. Karle's process examined the possibilities of reconstructive technologies and future evolution through biotechnological advancements and questioned whether the remains of extinct species can be used to create new life forms. The artworks are novel evolutionary  forms based upon the extinct species to explore “hypothetical evolutions through technological regeneration”(Karle) and De-extinction, 3D printed in biocompatible polyamide. The pieces function as specimens and relics  which depict the relationship between structures that once served now-extinct creatures in the past for the purpose of finding application for future forms leveraging their framework, Evolutionary biology, evolutionary computing, Speculative evolution, and art. Morphologies of Resurrection was part of the largerRegeneration Through Technology Smithsonian Institution collaboration with Artist Amy Karle where she created nine sculptures in two series examining the possibilities of reconstructive technologies and the potential and the pitfalls of future evolution that come with technological advancements.

This collection was shown at The Smithsonian in 2020  and continues to exhibit online on the homepage of the Smithsonian's open access platform  The sculptures were also exhibited as part of the Science Gallery Rotterdam's exhibition (UN)REAL. and related 2020 Ars Electronica “In Kepler's Gardens” Rotterdam 

Following Regeneration Through Technology (2020), Amy Karle expanded her work in bioart and computational biology to decentralized computing and blockchain for biology and genetics. As an early adaptor of NFT technology, Amy Karle extended her work in Digital art, Bioart, Generative Art, and autonomous art into the Metaverse and Web3. Karle stated: "I see decentralization as a vehicle to transcend the physical limitations of what art - and our lives - can be." She is notably the first Bioartist to work in blockchain and create NFTs.

The Skull Collection (2021–22), is a series of NFT artworks by Amy Karle that “are contemplations of how we can transcend the physical into the digital after we die.”  The digital art includes data from human skull that she previously 3D scanned at the California Academy of Sciences," and previously also used in her 3D sculpture The Incorruptible Body (2016). The blue-chip NFT art collection depicts the artist's research of digital remains that are left after a human death, while simultaneously working through ways that living beings could live on after death by use of exponential technology, using the human body and blockchain as part of the artmaking tools in the process. The artist is working through ways that the body can be used after death, the traces of persona left online, and how technology such as algorithms, machine learning, neural networking and AI can be used to continue to create artwork after death. The Skull Collection imagery is generated through the artist's process of crafting such a technology that can create artworks as she does after she passes away.  The Skull Collection was exhibited in the Metaverse in OnCyber Wake Gallery in March 2022 

Karle has continuously experimented with transferring consciousness and “life” to another body, machine, or computer as also demonstrated in her bioart and biofeedback works, including her experiments with brain-computer interfaces, and her "Biofeedback Art" (2011) where she reflected her body and consciousness in a fusion of technology and bio-performance through an analog computer in real-time. Karle's work “breaks with conventional conceptions of corporeality” to challenge who and what humanity could become through exponential technologies, both positive and negative, and how interventions could alter the course of the future. Her work merges physical, computational, and biological systems to create new, future-facing hybridized forms of art, fusing ultra-contemporary fine art with biotech and digital culture that is “not only technically fascinating, but also emotionally touching”.

The Heart of Evolution? (2019) is a biomechanical sculpture taking the form of a beating human heart placed on exhibition in Japan where there was historically great controversy surrounding organ transplant, specifically cardiac transplants, see Organ transplantation in Japan. The work proposes a redesigned vascular system with the potential to enhance heart function, and the potential to grow replacement organs in a lab as opposed to using human or other animal transplants, while questioning the implications of enhancement on what it means to be human and impacts on evolution. It was 3D printed in biocompatible materials collaboration with HP Labs and exhibited at the Mori Art Museum, Tokyo, Japan (2019–20). 

As part of Ars Electronica .ART Global Gallery 2020, Karle exhibited The Heart of Evolution?, plus a collection of digitally enhanced prints The Body and Technology: A Conversational Metamorphosis (2017) and a performance video art work Biofeedback (2011) which used an image processor as an electrophysiological visualization device.

Internal Collection (2016–17) is a series of 3D garments based on human anatomy and showing internal biosystems such as muscular, nervous, and cardiovascular.

Some of these garments were shown at FILE Electronic Language International Festival, São Paulo, Brazil (2017). Internal Collection includes a lavender silk and silver metal dress based on the pulmonary system, a blue silk unisex jumpsuit based on the nervous system and a yellow dress based on ligaments and tendons; these were exhibited together as part of Future and the Arts: AI, Robotics, Cities, Life - How Humanity Will Live Tomorrow (2019-2020) at the Mori Art Museum.

Feast of Eternity (2016) is sculpture of a human skull form that used crystallization on a 3D printed lattice to show how cells grow along a lattice. It was exhibited at The Life Art Science Technology (LAST) Festival 2018 (Stanford University).

Biofeedback Art (2011) is a durational Performance art piece where Amy Karle connects her body to a Sandin Image Processor, and repurposes it to read the changes that occur while she lays still and meditates over periods of 5–8 hours. This creates the output of every-changing experimental Video art and Sound art in real-time. The artwork is both the long-duration performance Endurance art as well as the experimental Video art and Sound art that is created in the process. "It consists, roughly, of an experimental interaction between biofeedback sensors and the processing of this data by the classic analog computer known historically as Sandin IP. Visual and sound effects are produced from waves captured through sensors, which in turn are interpreted by archaic technology. Depending on the intentions and the state of the mental body emitted by the connected person, it is possible to control the images and sounds generated by the computer."(Pantaleão,Pinheiro 2015)  It was performed at the Detroit Institute for the Arts in 2011 and has been exhibited at Post Life Beijing Media Art Biennale, Beijing, China 2018 and at TCAS Tian Contemporary Art Space. Shanghai, China in 2019 

Karle has created a body of artworks and performances using biofeedback and neurofeedback, including:
Biofeedback Art,  2011 durational performance art using her body connected to a Sandin Image Processor to create video and sound in real time.
Brainsongs, 2015 performance art. Karle connected her brain activity an electroencephalogram (EEG) neuroheadset to musical instruments in a digital interface to output music.
Resonation, 2015 performance at Signal Culture, New York where Karle used her body, an Emotiv EEG neuroheadset and Chladni plate subwoofer and  s bioinformatics into cymatics, generating bio-signals into visuals and sounds 
Performance in Salt Mine, 2018 durational performance art in UNESCO World Heritage Site Bochnia Salt Mine and Wieliczka Salt Mine to share the experience and the pressures on the body being in the historically significant Salt Mines of Poland that reach over 1000 feet down into the earth. She used an electroencephalogram (EEG) neuroheadset to translate her brainwaves into digital music and projected visualization of brainwaves. Sound of brainwave recording and part of the recording of the performance was also used in a planetarium film by Amy Karle and shown at the Heavens of Copernicus Planetarium at Copernicus Science Centre in Warsaw, Poland. She created this artwork during her work as an Artist Diplomat exchange artist to Poland.
Her body of Biofeedback work leverages art, video art, biofeedback, neurofeedback, electroencephalography, biomediation, and transhumanism to explore the extent to which the processing of biosignals and bioelectric activity of human brain into art may serve as a tool to expand understanding and self-perception, learning, the capacity of the human body-mind, and connections with the self and others. "According to Karle, 'art is a means for the continuous exploration of issues that involve the material body within its spiritual, evolutionary and nostalgic duality, as ways of accessing transcendence through research. Her work is intended to serve as an awareness agent, both for herself and for others, addressing essential ontological issues that seek to reach the “chords of truth” in order to ignite self-realization.'"

Reprocessed (2009) was a piece of Ephemeral art, a floor-length gown made from slices of processed meat unfit for eating; the dress had a short life to reflect the 'ephemerality' of beauty. See

Awards 

 BBC 100 Women 2019 (That year's theme was "The Female Future".)
 Grand Prize YouFab Global Creative Awards 2017
 Most Influential Women in 3D Printing 2017
[1 of] 10 of the most inspirational women in the world

Distinctions 
 Artist Diplomat through US Department of State, American Arts Incubator 
 Salzburg Global Fellow 
Future Innovators Summit Think Tank member-contributor (A Creative Think Tank for Big Questions about the Future to formulate questions of central importance to humankind's future. Topics include: How AI can impact humanity and Death-Life

Residencies 
Smithsonian Institution Washington, DC USA
HP Labs, Palo Alto, California USA 
Centrum Nauki Kopernik  (Copernicus Science Centre) Artist in Residence Warsaw, Poland 
Autodesk Artist in Residence San Francisco, California USA
Signal Culture Owego, New York USA 

The way in which technology can capture a form and impact evolution was part Karle's collaboration with the Smithsonian Institution's Museum of Natural History and Digitization Program. A 3D scan had been made of Hatcher the Triceratops skeleton. Karle used the scan data to create a series of artworks imagining new forms based upon extinct species as “hypothetical evolutions through technological regeneration”, an example of information art. In all Karle created nine sculptures in two series: Deep Time and the Far Future and Morphologies of Resurrection as part of Regeneration Through Technology (2020).

Karle was an Artist Diplomat on an American Arts Incubator cultural exchange funded by the U.S. Department of State's Bureau of Educational and Cultural Affairs. Karle visited Poland in 2018 and ran a number of workshops focusing on women's empowerment in STEAM fields. During residency Karle shared her digital and art skills to empower STEAM women. As a result of the initiative, Karle and 20 Polish artists presented Layers of Life at the Copernicus Science Centre in Warsaw.

Karle collaborated with Autodesk at the Pier 9 Residency program in San Francisco and created Regenerative Reliquary (2016) to interrogate ways we can change the structure of our bodies.

Exhibitions 
 2022: Unknown Unknowns Milano Triennale, Italy. 
 2022: Perfect Body ESC Medien Kunst Labor. Graz, Austria.
 2022: Art, Design & Technology Astro Studios. San Francisco, USA. 
 2022: The Skull Collection Wake Gallery, OnCyber, The Metaverse   
 2022: Gaia: Gene, Algorithm, Intelligent Design and Automata_ A Mirage Self, The Other Realm Museum of Contemporary Art Taipei (MoCA Taipei) Taipei, Taiwan 
 2021/22: Future U RMIT Gallery, Melbourne, Australia 
 2021: Am I Human to You? KUBE Art Museum, Ålesund, Norway 
 2020: Regeneration Through Technology Smithsonian Institution National Museum of American History, Washington, D.C., USA 
 2020: [UN]REAL Science Gallery, Rotterdam, The Netherlands
 2020: In Kepler's Gardens Ars Electronica Garden, Rotterdam, The Netherlands
 2020: Ars Electronica .ART Global Gallery (online)
 2019/20: Future and the Arts: How Humanity Will Live Tomorrow Mori Art Museum, Tokyo, Japan
 2019/20: The State of Us The Lowry, Manchester, England
 2019: Future Art and Life, Post Life Tian Contemporary Art Museum, Shanghai, China
 2019: La Fabrique Du Vivant Centre Pompidou, Paris, France
 2018/19: Future Humanity – Our Shared Planet Ars Electronica, Beijing, China
 2018: Post Life Beijing Media Art Biennale, Beijing, China
 2018: Ars Electronica Export, Tokyo, Japan
 2018: Layers of Life: What is Life in The Biotech Era? Centrum Nauki Kopernik, Warsaw, Poland
 2018: Planetarium Show. Heavens of Copernicus Planetarium, Centrum Nauki Kopernik Warsaw, Poland 
 2018: L.A.S.T. SLAC National Accelerator Laboratory, Stanford University California, USA
 2017: Collaborative Futures – Design, Technology and Art Good Design Marunouchi, Tokyo, Japan 
 2017: Artificial Intelligence: AI / The Other I Ars Electronica Linz, Austria 
 2017: FILE Electronic Language International Festival (Festival de Linguagem Eletrônica) São Paulo, Brazil

References

External links 

 

Living people
21st-century American artists
American women artists
American contemporary artists
Date of birth missing (living people)
BBC 100 Women
BioArtists
American conceptual artists
New media artists
American digital artists
American performance artists
American philosophers
Bioethicists
American futurologists
Artists from New York (state)
Artists from San Francisco
Alfred University alumni
Cornell University alumni
1980 births
21st-century American women artists